"Proof/No Vain" is Mell's second single under Geneon Entertainment. "Proof" was used as the first ending theme for the anime series Hayate no Gotoku!. The single reached number 18 in the Oricon charts and sold a total of 13,000 copies.

Track listing

References

2007 singles
2007 songs
Mell songs
Hayate the Combat Butler songs
Song recordings produced by I've Sound